Damien Couturier (born 9 July 1981) is a French former professional rugby league footballer who played in the 2000s and 2010s, and has coached in the 2010s. He played in the Championship for Hull Kingston Rovers, Leigh Centurions and Toulouse Olympique, and at international level for France. He was a goal-kicking  whose most notable achievement as a player was helping Hull Kingston Rovers achieve promotion to Super League in 2006.

Following the end of his playing career, Couturier became assistant coach of Toulouse Olympique.

References

External links
Toulouse Olympique Squad List

1984 births
Living people
France national rugby league team players
French rugby league coaches
French rugby league players
Hull Kingston Rovers players
Leigh Leopards players
Rugby league centres
Toulouse Olympique players